Chai Point is an Indian tea company and a cafe chain which focuses on tea-based beverages. As of October, 2017, the company also started selling their teas on Amazon.in, making it their first foray into distribution via the e-commerce platform. Chai Point's motto of "India runs on Chai" is apt for Indians' love for tea.

History 
Chai Point was founded in Bengaluru, Karnataka, India in 2010 by Amuleek Singh. The name Chai Point is derived from the word Chai which is the Hindi word for tea. Amuleek Singh, the founder and current CEO of Chai Point is a Harvard Graduate. After he obtained his engineering degree from Thapar University, Punjab, India, he worked with Microsoft for some time. After this once he completed his MBA from Harvard, that's when he wanted to work on a startup.

Chai (Tea) is an integral part of a large majority of Indian home and different varieties of teas are also not alien to most of the Indians. Amuleek Singh, however, created an entire ecosystem of making the tea and its packaging more appealing to white collar Indians who were latching on to the high end coffee joints.

Locations 
Chai Point has presence in eight Indian cities with presence across retail locations, airports, and business parks. In addition to physical format stores, the chain has a delivery service and a vending based solution called 'Vending as a Service'' focused primarily at corporation.

Model 
Unlike other similar beverage chains, which run on a Basic Franchise Model, Chai Point runs on a company-owned store Model.

Investors

Chai Point raised a total of ₹71.2 crore ($10 million) in round one of funding in September, 2015. On April 19, 2018, tea retailer Chai Point said it had raised ₹132 crore ($20 million) in series C funding, its single-largest round so far. Key investors in Chai Point include:

 Eight Road Ventures (Lead Investor, formerly Fidelity Growth Partners India)
 DSG Investors
 Saama Capital
 Paragon Partners

References

External links 

 Instagram account
 Tea and cafe point in Gtb nagar delhi

Tea houses
Drink companies of India
2010 establishments in Karnataka